Laghmani or Loghmani (adjective form of the toponym Laghman) is a Persian and Tunisian habitational surname. Notable people with the surname include:

 Abdullah Laghmani (1960s–2009), Afghan deputy chief of Security
  (1923–2015), Tunisian poet
 Ali Loghmani (born 1962), Iranian cinematographer
 Isa Khan Laghmani (born 1987), soldier of the Afghanistan National Army

Arabic-language surnames
Persian-language surnames
Dari-language surnames
Toponymic surnames